International Blackjazz Society is the seventh studio album by Norwegian avant-garde metal band Shining. It was released on October 23, 2015 through Spinefarm Records.

The first album of the band without original drummer Torstein Lofthus, it is also the first album with his replacement Tobias Ørnes Andersen and keyboardist Eirik Tovsrud Knutsen, and the last with bassist Tor Egil Kreken, who had been a part of the band for all of their metal-oriented albums.

Critical reception

Upon the release, International Blackjazz Society received generally positive reviews. At Metacritic, which assigns a normalized rating out of 100 to reviews from mainstream publications, the album received an average score of 77, based on 8 reviews.

Track listing

Personnel

Musicians 
Jørgen Munkeby – vocals, guitars, saxophone, keys, bass guitar
 Håkon Sagen – guitars
 Tor Egil Kreken - bass guitar
 Eirik Tovsrud Knutsen – keyboards, synthesizer
 Tobias Ørnes Andersen – drums

Production staff 
Jørgen Munkeby – Producer
Sean Beavan - Executive Producer

References 

Shining (Norwegian band) albums
2015 albums